Catron can refer to:

Places
Catron, Missouri, in the United States
Catron County, New Mexico, in the United States

People
John Catron (1786–1865), United States Supreme Court justice
Thomas B. Catron (1840–1921), U.S. Senator from New Mexico
Sam Catron (1953–2002), assassinated sheriff of Pulaski County, Kentucky, USA
Michael Catron (born 1955), American publisher
Joevan Catron (born 1988), American professional basketball player